Ariana Rockefeller (born May 26, 1982) is an American heiress, model and amateur equestrian. She is a granddaughter of banker David Rockefeller, a great-granddaughter of financier John D. Rockefeller Jr., and a great-great-granddaughter of John D. Rockefeller, founder of Standard Oil.

Early life and education 
Ariana Rockefeller was born to David Rockefeller Jr. and Diana Newell Rockefeller. Her hometown is Cambridge, Massachusetts, but she was raised in New York and Maine. 

Her father served as the chair and remains a trustee of the Rockefeller Foundation. Her sister, Camilla Rockefeller, a fellow Columbia University graduate, is the chairwoman of David Rockefeller Fund. She is a niece of ecologist Abby Rockefeller, economist Neva Goodwin, philanthropists and businesswomen Peggy Dulany and Eileen Rockefeller Growald, and family physician Richard Rockefeller.

Her paternal grandfather, David Rockefeller, was a billionaire businessman and the former chairman of Chase Bank from 1969 to 1981 as well as chairman of the Council on Foreign Relations from 1970 to 1985. He was the youngest son of John D. Rockefeller Jr. and grandson of Standard Oil founder John D. Rockefeller.

She attended the Ethel Walker School, an all-girls boarding school in Connecticut. She graduated from Columbia University with a B.A. in Political Science in 2009. As a college student, she interned at the United Nations.

Career

Fashion and lifestyle business 
Rockefeller launched her own fashion line in 2011. In 2014, she opened a pop-up shop in the SoHo neighborhood of Manhattan. She added a line of handbags in 2015 after hiring handbag designer Bassam Ali. In January 2021, she reported that she closed her fashion business "a couple of years ago".

Equestrian career 
Rockefeller began riding horses when she was three years old. She competed on the equestrian team in high school, during which time she took an interest in show jumping. She took a break from riding in college, and resumed by partaking in competitive show jumping in 2012. In 2015, Rockefeller placed fourth in the Hampton Classic.

Modeling 
In May 2021, Rockefeller signed with Marilyn Agency in New York to work on special projects in their talent division.

Philanthropy 
Rockefeller has served on the board of the nonprofit David Rockefeller Fund. Rockefeller supports the Humane Society of the United States. She is a board member of God's Love We Deliver and a Junior Associate of the Museum of Modern Art. Rockefeller has chaired the New York Botanical Garden's Winter Ball for several years. She also continues her family tradition of involvement and interest in ancient Greek culture and archaeology.

Views on family legacy and fossil fuel divestment 
In a 2016 interview on CBS This Morning, she spoke out against the #Exxonknew campaign that was started by members of the Rockefeller family, among them her cousin David Kaiser, son of Neva Goodwin Rockefeller, and distant relative, Valerie Rockefeller Wayne, daughter of former Senator Jay Rockefeller, revealing a sharp divide within the family over its legacy in the petroleum industry and fossil fuel divestment. She also criticized the ongoing campaign to target ExxonMobil, a company that her family founded, as "deeply misguided" and "counterproductive" to ''Exxon's ongoing good work in clean and renewable energy'' in a New York Times piece.

Personal life 
On September 4, 2010, Rockefeller married entrepreneur Matthew Bucklin. It was reported by the New York Post on October 30, 2019, that the couple have divorced, after nine years of marriage. The couple filed for divorce in April 2019.

Rockefeller started dating NBA basketball player Enes Kanter in 2020.

References 

Rockefeller family
1982 births
Living people
American fashion designers
American female equestrians
Columbia College (New York) alumni
American women fashion designers